Hungry Jack Lake is a lake in Cook County, Minnesota, in the United States.

Hungry Jack Lake was putatively named for Anderson Jackson Scott, a surveyor's assistant who at this lake was temporarily without food supplies.

See also
List of lakes in Minnesota

References

Lakes of Minnesota
Lakes of Cook County, Minnesota